The Babymetal World Tour 2015 was the second worldwide concert tour by Japanese band Babymetal. Supporting the international re-release of their eponymous debut album, the tour ran from 23 April 2015 to 13 December 2015, taking place in Japan, the United States, Canada, Mexico, and several countries in Europe. The tour commenced on 29 May 2015, less than a month before the worldwide release of Babymetal.

Background 
Babymetal performed their first show of 2015 at Saitama Super Arena on 10 January 2015. At the show's closure, the band announced the tour with a key performance set for Makuhari Messe, the next part of the lore of Episode III of the Metal Resistance.

Prior to the announcement of the world tour, Babymetal released the song "Road of Resistance" as a single. According to Nakamoto, the song is about "paving a new path", which was the goal for the tour. She also explained that two weeks of rehearsals preceded the tour, which she felt was insufficient. 

The first tour dates were announced on 10 February 2015, with dates for Mexico, Canada, United States, Germany, Austria and Japan. Additional dates were later announced in France, Switzerland, Italy. After the concert at Makuhari Messe on 21 June 2015, which became the band's highest attended show to date with 25,000 people, the band extended the tour with a new leg entitled Babymetal World Tour 2015 in Japan (stylized as BABYMETAL WORLD TOUR 2015 in JAPAN) and ten new tour dates.

During the tour, the band made appearances at the Reading and Leeds Festivals, Metrock, Download Festival (with prominent power metal band DragonForce), the 2015 Metal Hammer Golden Gods Awards, Tokyo's Ultra Music Festival with Skrillex, and Ozzfest.

Concert synopsis

The concert begins with an opening movie addressing the audience and announcing regulations for the show, followed by the playing of the accompanying Kami Band. The three members project silhouettes onto a curtain in front of the stage, which then falls as the band first performs "Iine!" The Kami Band back up the three with their performance as they dance magnificently to "Megitsune", and contrast their cute and pop songs with the heavy sound from their regular number "Doki Doki ☆ Morning", becoming heated on the floor. "Awadama Fever" has Su-metal performing call and response with the audience shouting "Oh! Yeah!"

Following the performance of "Uki Uki ★ Midnight", the three members leave the stage, as the Kami Band proceeds into a jam session that transitions into Su-metal's solo "Akatsuki". The audience evidently moshes in response to the vocal performance, which includes some croud-surfing. Next, Yuimetal and Moametal perform as Black Babymetal for their song "Song 4", which emphasizes their charming appearances to the crowd.

The three members collect again to perform "Headbangeeeeerrrrr!!!!!" which brings the concert towards its climax. They perform a new song, "Yava!", which premiered during the tour, followed by "Ijime, Dame, Zettai" to keep the excitement up. The band starts "Gimme Chocolate!!" with Yuimetal and Moametal shouting "I can't hear you!" and "Louder, louder!" to the crowd in the interlude, followed by the audience parroting the chorus after Su-metal, who then shouts "Thank you!"

Performing the final song, "Road of Resistance", the three members of Babymetal reappear on the stage, holding flags depicting the band's logo. As the song finishes, the three members repeatedly shout "We are Babymetal!", and walk off the stage after yelling "See you!", the venue filled with heat.

Broadcast and recording
The concert held at Makuhari Messe on 21 June was broadcast live across 24 theaters in Japan with 5000 viewers in total. Wowow broadcast the Summer Sonic concerts held on 15 and 16 August, and will also broadcast the first concert held in Yokohama Arena in April 2016. The non-canon Apocrypha shows on 23 April and 24 April 2015 were released as part of "The One" limited edition of Metal Resistance, and the shows at Makuhari Messe and Yokohama Arena, as well as the show at Saitama Super Arena, were later released as a limited edition box set titled Trilogy: Metal Resistance Episode III – Apocalypse.

Set list

Tour dates

Video releases 

Footage from select shows were released in limited quantities to members of the band's official fanclub "The One".  is a member-exclusive album release by Babymetal. It was first released on 14 August 2015 as a limited-quantity live video to "The One" fanclub members. The performance was also included as part of the box set Trilogy: Metal Resistance Episode III – Apocalypse (stylized as TRILOGY - METAL RESISTANCE EPISODE III - APOCALYPSE) in limited edition Blu-ray box set released exclusively to "The One" fanclub members on 1 September 2016, and as a stand-alone Blu-ray release for a limited time general sale on 19 September 2016.

Background 
At the end of Legend "2015": New Year Fox Festival on 10 January 2015, the band announced a show set at Makuhari Messe on 21 June 2015. Tickets were announced for sale on 20 February 2015 on the band's official website, and the show was later confirmed for broadcast as a result of tickets selling out. 25,000 people attended the show, and at its conclusion, the band announced an extension of the tour set in Japan, with two shows at Yokohama Arena confirmed for 12 and 13 December 2015. Tickets were first made available to "The One" fanclub members on 9 September 2015.

On 1 June 2016, the band announced a box set release with three Blu-ray discs each containing footage from the show Legend 2015, and tour dates at Makuhari Messe on 21 June and Yokohama Arena on 13 December, as well as a photobook containing shots from the Babymetal World Tour 2015. The set was made available on 1 January 2016 exclusively to "The One" fanclub members. On 13 September 2016, a standalone Blu-ray release featuring all three shows was announced for a limited time sale during the band's performances at Tokyo Dome on 19 and 20 September 2016. The album is set to  be released in a vinyl edition  exclusively for "The One" fanclub members on 10 October 2021.

Content 
Approximately 20,000 people attended the show "Legend 2015". An introductory video narrates the progress of the band's Metal Resistance, calling the followers part of the community called "The One". Beginning with the song "Megitsune", the band plays through all the songs from Babymetal, while performing the new songs "Awadama Fever" and, in the encore, "Road of Resistance", during which Nakamoto instructs the crowd to sing "Wow wow" at the bridge. The three band members walk down the runways in the arena, continually shouting "We are!" with the crowd responding "Babymetal!", ending after the members return to the stage. Afterwards, another video introduces the crowd to the Babymetal World Tour 2015.

For the performance at Makuhari Messe, the band played through several songs from their debut album Babymetal, and new songs like "Awadama Fever", "Road of Resistance", and the newly premiered "Yava!", which contained elements of electro.

The band would play most of the same songs at the final show of the tour at Yokohama Arena, in addition to premiering the new songs "Karate" and "The One". For the latter song, the three band members performed on a pyramid-shaped platform, which would be seen flying over the audience of 26,000 people.

Track listing 
The standalone release of Legend 2015: New Year Fox Festival consists only of tracks from disc one.

Notes
 Kami Band performs "Mischiefs of Metal Gods" before "Rondo of Nightmare" in all shows.
 The CD album release of Legend 2015: New Year Fox Festival splits the performance between tracks 12 and 13 onto two separate discs, and lists "Mischiefs of Metal Gods" as a separate track from "Rondo of Nightmare".

Release history 
Legend "2015": New Year Fox Festival

Trilogy: Metal Resistance Episode III – Apocalypse

Notes

References

External links
 Official Babymetal website

2015 concert tours
Babymetal concert tours
Concert tours of North America
Concert tours of the United States
Concert tours of Mexico
Concert tours of Canada
Concert tours of Europe
Concert tours of the United Kingdom
Concert tours of France
Concert tours of Germany
Concert tours of Asia
Concert tours of Japan